Alta Floresta d'Oeste is a municipality located in the Brazilian state of Rondônia. Its population was 22,728 (2020) and its area is 7,067 km².

It holds part of the  Guaporé Biological Reserve, a strictly protected conservation unit.

References

Municipalities in Rondônia